Advanced Aeromarine (later HighCraft AeroMarine) was an aircraft manufacturer based in Ocoee, Florida.  It built light aircraft and sailplanes, developing a number of successful designs that have been produced by a number of different firms over the years.

Aeromarine designs were licensed to Advanced Aviation for some time before being acquired by Keuthan Aircraft.

List of aircraft
Advanced Aeromarine Buccaneer, 1980s Single-engine two-seat amphibious ultralight.  High-wing pusher configuration
Advanced Aeromarine Carrera, 1990s Single-engine two-seat ultralight. High-wing pusher configuration
Advanced Aeromarine Sierra 1990s Sailplane. Pod and boom configuration
Advanced Aeromarine Mallard

Defunct aircraft manufacturers of the United States
Companies based in Orange County, Florida
Defunct companies based in Florida
Ocoee, Florida